Santa Rosa Cathedral or Cathedral of Santa Rosa, or variants thereof, may refer to:

 Santa Rosa Cathedral (California), United States
 Santa Rosa Cathedral (Carúpano), Venezuela
 Santa Rosa Cathedral (La Pampa), Argentina; see Roman Catholic Diocese of Santa Rosa in Argentina
 Santa Rosa de Osos Cathedral, Colombia
 Santa Rosa de Copán Cathedral, Honduras

See also
 Saint Rose (disambiguation) or Santa Rosa
 Santa Rosa (disambiguation)
 St. Rose's Church (disambiguation)